The cricotracheal ligament connects the cricoid cartilage with the first ring of the trachea.

It resembles the fibrous membrane which connects the cartilaginous rings of the trachea to each other.

References 

Ligaments of the head and neck